Lucy Gaskell (born 10 July 1980) is a British actress. She studied at the Royal Welsh College of Music & Drama in 1998.

Career
Gaskell made her professional stage debut in the Oxford Stage Company's production of The Cherry Orchard which toured the UK in June/July 2003. Gaskell was nominated for the Best Newcomer 2003 award by the Royal Television Society for her role in Cutting It.

Gaskell is known for the roles of Ruby Ferris in the BBC One drama series Cutting It and Kirsty Clements in Casualty. She has also appeared in television and in theatre in numerous roles including Waking the Dead, Holby City, and Where the Heart Is.  Other recent roles include Kathy Costello Nightingale in the 2007 Doctor Who episode "Blink" and Judy in Lesbian Vampire Killers. In 2010 she began a recurring role in the BBC horror drama Being Human as Sam, the love interest of main character George. From 2010 to 2011, she starred in Casualty, playing nurse Kirsty Clements, starring alongside schoolfriend Georgia Taylor, who plays Dr Ruth Winters. When she joined Casualty she said in interviews that she was contracted indefinitely, but her pregnancy meant that she left after only one year.

Personal life
Gaskell has been married to actor Mark Bonnar since 28 December 2007. They have two children: Martha, born July 2011, and Samuel, born June 2015.

Gaskell is an ambassador for the domestic violence survivors' charity, Women's Aid.

Filmography

Film

Television

Video games

Theatre
The Big House (Lennox Robinson) 2007 – Abbey Theatre, Dublin – Kate Alcock
Taking Stock (Rob Johnstone) 2005 – The Studio, Manchester
The Lunatic Queen (Torben Betts) 2005 – Riverside Studios, London – Princess Juana
All the Ordinary Angels (Nick Leather) 2005 – Manchester Royal Exchange Theatre – Lulu
Portugal (Zoltán Egressy) 2004 Cottesloe Theatre, National Theatre London – Ribbon
The Cherry Orchard 2003 Oxford Stage Company national tour – Dunyasha

Radio

Other work
Sapphire and Steel: Water Like a Stone – The Girl
Sapphire and Steel: Cruel Immortality – The Carer
Fable III – Various Voices
Being Human – Bad Blood – Audiobook Reader

References

External links

People from Wigan
English television actresses
English film actresses
English stage actresses
English radio actresses
Alumni of the Royal Welsh College of Music & Drama
Living people
1980 births
21st-century English actresses